Modern Life? is a British film production company. Founded by Phil Hobden and Ross Boyask, Modern Life? has produced such films as Left for Dead and Ten Dead Men.

Background

Modern Life? was originally called For This Is Film (1992-1994) and later became Underground Productions (1994-1996). In 1997 it was renamed as Modern Life?.

Early years

From 1993 to 2001, Modern Life? was involved in the production of almost 40 short films. 

In 1998 the company's short film Lone Wolf was screened on Channel 4 in the UK.

In 1998 the first Modern Life? feature film was developed, the dark comedy Brighton Born, Brighton Dead which sat with Miramax UK for over two years.  Eventually the relationship broke down and the screenplay was never produced.

In 2000/2001 Modern Life? managing partner Phil Hobden was offered the chance to work on the Dave Courtney gangster action film Hell to Pay alongside its original director Ross Boyask but turned it down, instead focusing on setting up Modern Life?

In 2001 the short film "Pure Vengeance", starring Scott Adkins (Bourne Ultimatum, The Shepherd: Border Patrol), Brendan Carr (Love Struck, Ten Dead Men''' and Gordon Alexander (Accidental Spy, The Purifiers) was screened on the Jonathan Ross show Stop Kung Fu.

Left For Dead
In 2002 Modern Life? started work on their first feature film, the low-budget martial arts action feature Left for Dead.

Starring Glenn Salvage and newcomer Andy Prior, the film features cameos by Bourne Ultimatum star Joey Ansah, Brendan Carr, Cecily Faye and Jeremy Bailey.  Finished in late 2004, the film was shot for under £10,000 and has been released in 14 countries, including the UK, Canada, USA, and Thailand.  The film was released in the US to positive reviews in September 2005 and then eventually in the UK in March 2007.  Left for Dead was acquired for broadcast on Sky channel's Movies4Men in late 2007.  However, Movies4Men subsequently decided the film was too violent and opted not to screen the movie.

Ten Dead MenModern Life?'s second film is the action thriller Ten Dead Men.  Again directed by Ross Boyask and produced by Phil Hobden, the film stars Brendan Carr, Pooja Shah, former Steps singer Lee Latchford-Evans, JC Mac, Silvio Simac, and Terry Stone.Ten Dead Men sees Brendan Carr star as Ryan, a former killer gone straight who is dragged violently back into the life he left behind with brutal and bloody consequences.  With action by Hong Kong stunt man Jude Poyer (28 Weeks Later,  Hitman), and executive produced by David Hannay (Stone and The Man From Hong Kong) and Anthony I Ginnane.Ten Dead Men was released in France, Indonesia, Japan  and the UK.

Additional projectsModern Life? have numerous additional interests. The martial arts action comic book Night Warrior was based on a short film made by Modern Life? in 1994. Moidern Life? has released the UK films Infestation and The Silencer on PulpMovies.co.uk in partnership with UK studio Blackhorse Entertainment. 

In 2008 Modern Life? took over ownership of the British film-focused website lovebritishfilm.com. They rebranded the site lovebritishfilm.co.uk. The site aims to be the number one source of news and reviews for all types of British films from mainstream to arthouse, from studio to independent.

Associated companies
PulpMovies
Raging Psycho Comics
combat film
lovebritishfilm

FilmographyConversations with Dead Men (2008)Ten Dead Men (2008)Brutal (2006)Fixers (2006)Left for Dead (2005)The Johnna Man Associate (2005)10,000 Cigarettes (2004)Lone Wolf 2 : Break Time (2004)The Johnna Man (2003)Pure Vengeance (2002)Blue Eyes (1998)Lone Wolf (1998)And Penance More (1997)Asylum (1997)Fixing To Blow (1995)Butterfly Man (1995)Night Warrior: Deadly Jade (1995)Boyz Gone Bad (1994)Project Assassin'' (1993)

References

External links
'Modern Life?' Official Company site

Film production companies of the United Kingdom